The  is the name given to the hijacking between May3 and May4, 2000, of a Japanese bus by a user of internet forum 2channel after placing a warning on the website.

History

An hour after posting a cryptic threat in a thread with the name "Neomugicha" ("Neo-Barley Tea"; ネオむぎ茶), the 17-year-old hijacked a bus managed by Nishi-Nippon Railroad in Dazaifu, Fukuoka at 1:35p.m. Armed with a Gyuto knife (牛刀 "gyūtō" or chef's knife), he stabbed one passenger to death and injured two.  

The hijacking was reported by 2:47p.m. by a 40year old female passenger after she was able to escape from the bus.

The Special Assault Team's Osaka and Fukuoka teams stormed the hijacked bus and captured the teenager alive. The unnamed teenager was arrested under the Firearm and Sword Control Law and the Law for the Punishment of Extortion Involving Hostage-Taking. Due to the self-defense requirements as stipulated in the Law Concerning Execution of Duties of Police Officials, it took more than 15hours for the hostage crisis to end. 

The incident was resolved on May4 at 5:03a.m.

Aftermath
Later, a poster named "Neoūroncha" ("Neo-oolong tea") attempted to imitate Neomugicha by plotting to blow up the Odakyu Electric Railway in Japan and posting warnings about it on 2channel.  After the Neomugicha incident, however, the Japanese police were keeping a close eye on 2channel, so he was identified and arrested before his plan could be carried out.

A poster called "Neobīru" ("Neo-Beer") also attempted to imitate the incident, planning a terrorist attack on a railway company, but he was also arrested.

In 2006, the suspect was officially released from a medical reformatory facility. This action led to calls to reform the Juvenile Act, which was law since 1948.

The Hiroshima Prefectural Police established the Hostage Rescue Team in the Hiroshima Prefectural Police's Criminal Investigation Department as part of lessons learned from the incident.

See also

Kobe child murders
Akihabara massacre

Notes

References

Bibliography

External links
 Neomugicha's thread 

Terrorist incidents on buses in Asia
Murder committed by minors
2000 murders in Japan
2channel
Hijacking
2000 road incidents
Bus incidents in Japan
May 2000 events in Japan
Terrorist incidents in Japan in 2000